Rodger Gustaf Schmidt (born 20 June 1952) is a former German curler and curling coach.

He is a former World men's runner-up, European men's curling champion and two-time German men's curling champion (1987, 1992).

In 1994 he founded the "Rodger Schmidt Curling Academy" based in Lucerne (Switzerland).

Teams

Record as a coach of national teams

References

External links

1952 births
Living people
German male curlers
European curling champions
German curling champions
German curling coaches